Lynn Victory MCV-847 was one of 12 ships scheduled to be acquired by the Navy in February 1966 and converted into Forward Depot Ships, the forerunners of the Fast Deployment Logistics Ships (FDL). She was scheduled to be renamed Lynn and placed in service with the Military Sea Transport Service as USNS Lynn T-AG-182. The program, however, was canceled and the ships were not acquired by the Navy. Five companies competed for the Contract Definition Phase of the FDL program: Lockheed Shipbuilding and Construction Co., General Dynamics Corporation, Litton Industries Inc., Todd Shipyards Corporation, Bethlehem Steel Corporation.

References

Links

Auxiliary ships of the United States Navy
Victory ships
1945 ships